Kuzmir may refer to:

Kuzmir (Hasidic dynasty), Hasidic dynasty founded by Rebbe Yechezkel Taub
Kazimierz Dolny, town in central eastern Poland
Kazimierz, historical district of Kraków and Kraków Old Town, Poland

See also
Kazimierz (disambiguation)